The Eyes of My Mother is a 2016 American black-and-white horror film written, edited and directed by Nicolas Pesce in his directorial debut. It stars Kika Magalhães, Olivia Bond, Diana Agostini, and Paul Nazak. The film was produced by Borderline Presents and Tandem Pictures and distributed by Magnet Releasing.

The Eyes of My Mother premiered at the 2016 Sundance Film Festival and was theatrically released in the United States on December 2, 2016, by Magnet Releasing. The film received generally positive reviews from critics and a polarizing reception from audiences.

Plot
Francisca and her parents live on a farm where they raise animals. A trained surgeon, Francisca's mother teaches her how to remove eyeballs from farm animals, as well as the legend of St. Francis of Assisi. One day, Charlie, a door-to-door salesman, asks to use the bathroom. Against her better judgment, Francisca's mother lets him into the house. Charlie draws a gun and takes Francisca's mother into the bathroom. When her father comes home, he finds Charlie bludgeoning his wife’s body in the tub. He knocks Charlie out and chains him up in the barn. Francisca and her father bury her mother in the backyard. Francisca visits Charlie and he explains the thrill of killing others. Francisca removes Charlie's eyes and vocal cords, then bags them and puts them in the refrigerator. She explains to Charlie that he was not killed because he is her only friend and she will look after him.

Years later, the adult Francisca's father dies, and she preserves the body. She meets a young woman, Kimiko, at a bar. Kimiko and Francisca return to her home, but after learning that Francisca’s mother was killed, Kimiko is frightened when Francisca jokes oddly that she murdered her father. Kimiko tries to leave but Francisca murders her, chops her up and bags her organs, putting them in her refrigerator. Afterward, she bathes Charlie, still chained up in the barn, and brings him inside to sleep with her. Charlie attempts to escape, but she catches him and repeatedly stabs him. She tells him that he was right; killing another person “feels amazing”.

However, now distraught at being completely alone, she wanders the woods until she reaches a highway and catches a ride with a woman named Lucy back to the house. Lucy has a baby son named Antonio who Francisca kidnaps upon reaching the house. She stabs Lucy and praises her dead mother for bringing the pair to her, then keeps Lucy's son as her own child. Like Charlie, Lucy has her eyes and vocal cords cut out and is kept chained up in the barn.

When Antonio grows to about 8–9 years old, he becomes curious about the barn, seeing his mother go in and out of it and having been told to never enter. One night, while Francisca's asleep, he enters the barn and is shocked at seeing a person in chains, blind and groaning unintelligibly - his biological mother.

Lucy later escapes the barn, and blindly makes her way to a road where a trucker finds her. Francisca discovers the escape and digs up her mother’s body, cradling the skeleton and telling her how much she misses her. Upon her return to the house, she sees police coming to the house and rushes to wake Antonio. Taking him into the bathroom while holding a knife, she screams that the police will never take her baby. A gunshot is heard, and the film ends.

Cast
 Kika Magalhães as Francisca
 Olivia Bond as Young Francisca
 Diana Agostini as the Mother
 Paul Nazak as the Father
 Will Brill as Charlie
 Joey Curtis-Green as Antonio
 Clara Wong as Kimiko
 Flora Diaz as Lucy

Release
The Eyes of My Mother premiered in the NEXT section at the 2016 Sundance Film Festival on January 22, 2016. It was acquired by Magnolia Pictures' foreign language film division Magnet Releasing. It was released to select theaters and via iTunes, cable/satellite video on demand, and Amazon Video on December 2, 2016.

Soundtrack

Composer, Ariel Loh, exclaimed that he was inspired by simplistic music and wanted the score to reflect that. “There is always something stark and clean about a simple design that often gives it more weight and effectiveness than something intricate and complicated," Loh told Vehlinggo. The soundtrack was released by Waxwork Records on vinyl for the first time and included cues that didn't make it in the film, and featured album art by Nikita Kaun.

Reception

The Eyes of My Mother was positively received by critics. On Rotten Tomatoes, the film holds an approval rating of 78%, based on 101 reviews, with an average of 6.90/10. The site's consensus states: "The Eyes of My Mother uses a shocking trauma to fuel a hauntingly hypnotic odyssey whose nightmarish chill lingers long after the closing credits." Metacritic reports a 63 out of 100 rating, based on 23 critics, indicating "generally favorable reviews".

References

External links
 
 
 
 

2016 films
Portuguese-language films
2010s horror drama films
2016 independent films
American black-and-white films
American horror drama films
Gothic horror films
American independent films
Films directed by Nicolas Pesce
Films with screenplays by Nicolas Pesce
2016 directorial debut films
2016 drama films
Films about dysfunctional families
LGBT-related horror films
2016 LGBT-related films
Female bisexuality in film
LGBT-related drama films
Films about rape
2010s English-language films
2010s American films